Murwani Dam is a rock-fill embankment dam crossing wadi Murwani in Makkah Region, Saudi Arabia. It is located about 100 km northeast of Jeddah.

The 263 mio. SR contract to build the dam was awarded to Yuksel Insaat Saudia Co Ltd., a subsidiary of the Turkish company Yüksel Holding AŞ. Work on the dam began in 2004. The dam was completed in April 2010.

Main purpose of the dam is flood control, because of flash floods, which occur occasionally in the region (see also 2009 Jeddah floods).

Dam
Murwani Dam is a 102 (91 or 101) m tall (height above foundation) and 1,012 m long rock-fill embankment dam with a crest altitude of 251 m. The volume of the dam is 6,000,000 m³. The main dam on the right side has a length of 575 m (height 102 m), the saddle dam on the left of 437 m (height 30 m). The dam features a spillway, which is located between the two dams. Impermeability was achieved by using an asphalt-core, for which 80,000 tons of asphalt were used.

Reservoir
At full reservoir level the reservoir of the dam has a total capacity of 150 mio. m³. The estimated annual contribution into the reservoir is 31 mio. m³; about half of this
water will be used at a downstream drinking water treatment plant for potable use. The remaining water will be stored in an aquifer or will be lost to
free-surface evaporation.

See also
 List of dams and reservoirs in Saudi Arabia

External links

References

Dams in Saudi Arabia
Gravity dams
Dams completed in 2010
2010 establishments in Saudi Arabia
Mecca Province